Anthony "Tony" Tirabassi (born 30 October 1957) was a Liberal member of the House of Commons of Canada from 2000 to 2004. In the 2000 federal election he won the Niagara Centre riding in Ontario to become a member of the 37th Canadian Parliament; he succeeded the Liberal incumbent, retiring Speaker of the House Gilbert Parent, who had held the riding since its creation in 1988. He is a career salesman.

His term in Parliament included service as Parliamentary Secretary of the Treasury Board President.

Tirabassi retired from political life after his first term, when his Niagara Centre riding was abolished and replaced by other electoral districts due to redistribution. Tirabassi lost the Liberal nomination for the Welland riding to John Maloney, another incumbent Member of Parliament (see 2004 Liberal Party of Canada infighting).

References

External links
 

1957 births
Living people
Liberal Party of Canada MPs
Members of the House of Commons of Canada from Ontario
People from Thorold
21st-century Canadian politicians